Wayah (English: With Him) is a 2009 album by Amr Diab.  The album contains 12 tracks.

Public reception 
Wayah was released for sale in stores but the album was leaked online and illegally downloaded. Diab fans began a massive boycott of those sites and went to stores to support the artist.

Commercial performance 
The album topped the sales list, after selling more than 100,000 copies on the first day of its release, and has achieved sales of more than 3 million since its release in the summer of 2009.

Track listing 
Credits adapted from CD booklet.

Personnel 
Personnel as listed in the album's liner notes.

All Vocals By – Amr Diab
Artistic Vision By – Amr Diab
Produced & Arranged By – Hassan Al Shafei
Production Manager – Ahmed Zaghloul
Photography, Design By – Kareem Nour
Recorded, Mixed, Mastered By – Toni Cousins (Metropolis Studios)

Awards 
 African Music Awards 2009 ( Artist Of The Year - Song Of The Year - Music Video Of The Year - Male Act Of The Year )

References

2009 albums
Amr Diab albums
Rotana Records albums